Bothynoproctus mattoensis is a species of beetle in the family Carabidae. Described by Tschitscherine in 1900, it is the only species in the genus Bothynoproctus.

References

Pterostichinae